State Highway 71 (SH 71) is a New Zealand state highway connecting Kaiapoi/Christchurch with Rangiora.

Route

History
The highway was declared in 1992 after State Highway 72, the highway which serviced inland parts of Canterbury, was revoked (along with a number of other highways). SH 71 provided a southern connection to Rangiora from SH 1 in contrast to SH 72, which connected Rangiora to SH 1 from the east.

Route description
For the entire length of the highway, SH 71 is known as Lineside Road and parallels both the Main North Line of the South Island Main Trunk Railway and a 66 kV transmission line (between Southbrook and Kaiapoi substations) for much of the length. SH 71 can be accessed via offramps coming off SH 1 (as the Christchurch Northern Motorway). Smith Street, coming from Kaiapoi, also flows onto SH 71. Initially a northbound only exit, southbound access was provided in 2014.

Just south of Rangiora the road crosses the railway line at-grade. SH 71 officially ends after the crossing but the road continues into Rangiora.

See also
List of New Zealand state highways

References

External links
 New Zealand Transport Agency

71
Geography of Canterbury, New Zealand
Transport in Canterbury, New Zealand
Waimakariri District
Kaiapoi